Paulo Abi-Ackel (born 21 June 1963) is a Brazilian politician and pastor. He has spent his political career representing his home state of Minas Gerais, having served as state representative since 2006.

Personal life
He is the son of Ibrahim Abi-Ackel and Jacéa Cahú Abi-Ackel. His father Ibrahim is also a politician, who has served in both the state and national legislature. Before becoming a politician he worked as a lawyer.

Political career
Abi-Ackel voted in favor of the impeachment of then-president Dilma Rousseff. Abi-Ackel voted in favor of the 2017 Brazilian labor reform, and would vote against a corruption investigation into Rousseff's successor Michel Temer.

Abi-Ackel was one of Temer's strongest defenders from his party, drafting a proposal defending the then-president from corruption allegations.

References

1963 births
Living people
Brazilian Social Democracy Party politicians
Members of the Chamber of Deputies (Brazil) from Minas Gerais
Brazilian people of Arab descent
People from Belo Horizonte